KBVM (88.3 FM) is a radio station broadcasting a Catholic Christian radio format. Licensed to Portland, Oregon, United States, the station serves the Portland, Oregon area.  The station is currently owned by Catholic Broadcasting Northwest. The call letters are a reference to Mary, mother of Jesus's title the Blessed Virgin Mary, under whose patronage the station was placed at its dedication. On-air programming is simulcast in Eugene/Springfield on KMME, 100.5 FM and via an online stream.

References

External links

Radio stations established in 1989
1989 establishments in Oregon
BVM
Catholic radio stations